Marco Friedl (born 16 March 1998) is an Austrian professional footballer who plays as a left-back or centre-back for Bundesliga club Werder Bremen and the Austria national team.

Club career

Youth career
Friedl began his youth career at hometown club SV Kirchbichl in 2002, before moving to fellow Austrian club FC Kufstein in 2007. In 2008, he moved to the youth academy of German club Bayern Munich.

In 2017, Friedl won the 2016–17 A-Junioren Bundesliga Süd/Südwest with Bayern's under-19 team, scoring five goals during the season. The team went on to advance to the final of the A-Junioren Bundesliga championship round, before losing to Borussia Dortmund 8–7 on penalties.

Bayern Munich
Friedl began his senior career with Bayern Munich II in the 2015–16 season, making his debut in the Regionalliga Bayern on 22 November 2015 in a 2–0 derby loss against 1860 Munich II.

On 14 March 2017, Friedl signed his first professional contract with Bayern, lasting from 1 July 2017 through 30 June 2021.

Friedl scored his first goal for Bayern Munich II in the Regionalliga Bayern on 27 October 2017, opening the scoring in a 1–1 home draw against FV Illertissen.

Friedl began his first team career with Bayern Munich in the 2017–18 season, making his professional debut as a starter in the UEFA Champions League on 22 November 2017 in a 2–1 away win against Anderlecht. Three days later, Friedl made his league debut for the first team when he came on as a half-time substitute for James Rodríguez in the Bundesliga away match against Borussia Mönchengladbach, which finished as a 1–2 loss for Bayern.

Werder Bremen (loan)
On 25 January 2018, Friedl signed with Werder Bremen on an 18-month loan deal from Bayern Munich without an option to buy, lasting until 30 June 2019.

Werder Bremen
In May 2019, Werder Bremen announced the permanent signing of Friedl for the 2019–20 season. Friedl agreed a "long-term" contract with the club. The transfer fee was reported as €3 million or up to €3.5 million including possible bonuses, depending on the source.

Friedl scored his first Bundesliga goal on the sixth matchday of the season, against Borussia Dortmund in a 2–2 draw.

In July 2022, following Werder Bremen's return to the Bundesliga in the 2021–22 season, Friedl agreed a contract extension with the club.

International career

Youth
After progressing through the youth teams, Friedl made his Austria under-21 debut on 8 June 2017 in a qualification match for the 2019 UEFA European Under-21 Championship against Gibraltar. He opened the scoring in the 6th minute in the 3–0 home win.

Senior
Friedl made his national team debut on 7 October 2020 in a friendly against Greece.

Career statistics

Club

Honours
Bayern Munich
 DFL-Supercup: 2017

References

External links

 
 
 Marco Friedl at OeFB.at 
 
 

1998 births
Living people
People from Kufstein District
Footballers from Tyrol (state)
Association football fullbacks
Association football central defenders
Austrian footballers
Austria youth international footballers
Austria under-21 international footballers
Austria international footballers
FC Bayern Munich II players
FC Bayern Munich footballers
SV Werder Bremen players
SV Werder Bremen II players
Bundesliga players
3. Liga players
Regionalliga players
UEFA Euro 2020 players
Austrian expatriate footballers
Austrian expatriate sportspeople in Germany
Expatriate footballers in Germany